Oleksandr Heorhiyovych Dombrovskyi (born 7 July 1962, in Kalynivka, Ukraine) is a Ukrainian politician, member of the Verkhovna Rada (the Ukrainian parliament).

In 1990–1999 he worked as a specialist in foreign trade and cooperation. In 2002–2005 Dombrovskyi was a mayor of Vinnytsia.

In 2005–2010 he also served as a Governor of Vinnytsia Oblast. 

In the 2012 Ukrainian parliamentary election Dombrovskyi was elected to parliament as an independent candidate in constituency number 11 located in Vinnytsia Oblast In the 2014 Ukrainian parliamentary election he was reelected in the same constituency for Petro Poroshenko Bloc. Dombrovskyi did not take part in the 2019 Ukrainian parliamentary election.

See also
 List of mayors of Vinnytsia

References

External links
 Profile at the Official Ukraine Today portal

1962 births
Living people
People from Kalynivka
Taras Shevchenko National University of Kyiv alumni
Governors of Vinnytsia Oblast
Seventh convocation members of the Verkhovna Rada
Eighth convocation members of the Verkhovna Rada
Petro Poroshenko Bloc politicians
Our Ukraine (political party) politicians
People's Democratic Party (Ukraine) politicians
Mayors of places in Ukraine